, also known as , was one of the most successful professional Go players of the twentieth century.

Biography 
Kaku Takagawa won the Honinbō title nine times in a row, from 1952 to 1960, and was subsequently awarded the permanent title of Honorary Honinbo. He then chose Shukaku as his Honinbō name. He is one of the few Honorary Honinbos. He was known for having a healthy rivalry with Sakata Eio. This could be seen as Sakata would constantly beat Takagawa from 1959 to 1966 in the finals of major tournaments.

Takagawa's books, translated from their original Japanese, were instrumental in educating Westerners in the ways of Go. He also wrote a series of articles from 1961 through 1977 for the Nihon Ki-in which was the primary English source of information about Go during that period. These articles were later compiled into Improve Your Intuition, still considered a valuable guide for Go players.

Style 
Sakata Eio was known to talk about Takagawa's style of play. He included him in his book Killer Of Go, saying he'd drag out his games so they'd be longer and then his opponent would lose their edge. He was so very cool and collected during games, that he would never tense up before a match. This could be seen when he strolled to many Honinbō title wins. He was also noted to having a very steady and elegant style.

Promotion record

Titles and runners-up

Books 
How to Play Go, Nihon Ki-in 1956 review, used copies, cover
Vital Points of Go, Nihon Ki-in 1958 review
The Power of the Star-Point 
Improve Your Intuition Volume 1, Volume 2, Volume 3.

External links 
GoGameWorld Profile
GoBase Profile
Sensei's Library Profile
Collected Games

1915 births
1986 deaths
Japanese Go players
Go (game) writers
Recipients of the Medal with Purple Ribbon
Recipients of the Order of the Rising Sun, 3rd class